Kenneth "Chi" McBride (born September 23, 1961) is an American actor. He has appeared in films, where he is known primarily as a character actor, and in television, where he has had numerous starring roles.

In film, he has played prominent roles including The Frighteners (1996), Gone in 60 Seconds (2000), I, Robot (2004), Waiting... (2005), Let's Go to Prison (2006), and Draft Day (2014).

On television, he was high school principal Steven Harper on the series Boston Public, Emerson Cod on Pushing Daisies, Detective Laverne Winston on the Fox drama Human Target, Detective Don Owen on the short-lived CBS crime drama Golden Boy, and Captain Lou Grover on Hawaii Five-0.

Early life
McBride was born in Chicago, Illinois, from which his stage name derives. He was raised in the Seventh-day Adventist religion and attended Shiloh Academy, now known as Chicago SDA Academy, a Seventh-day Adventist school.  McBride originally planned to pursue a career in music. After studying several instruments and singing with gospel choirs in his native Chicago, he relocated to Atlanta, Georgia, in 1986 to work for AT&T as a billing clerk.

Career

His first success in show business came with the hit song "Basically, He's the Champ" as part of the group KSL, which parodied the marriage of boxer Mike Tyson and actress Robin Givens. Based on the tune's success, McBride was signed by Esquire Records, and he joined the rhythm and blues band Covert. Convinced he should try his hand in front of the camera, the singer moved to Los Angeles and, billed as "Chi", landed guest spots on Fox's In Living Color and NBC's The Fresh Prince of Bel-Air, as well as a featured role in the TV movie Revenge of the Nerds III: The Next Generation.

In 1998, he was a co-star of Mercury Rising, alongside Bruce Willis. He was later given the role of Principal Steven Harper on the series Boston Public. Much of McBride's work sees him playing right-hand man to the hero, as in the films Mercury Rising and The Terminal. He is also notable for television roles on The John Larroquette Show, House, The Secret Diary of Desmond Pfeiffer, Killer Instinct and Pushing Daisies.

McBride's other film credits include Cradle 2 the Grave,  The Distinguished Gentleman, Gone in 60 Seconds, The Frighteners, Narc, Disney's The Kid, I, Robot, Roll Bounce, Annapolis, Hoodlum, Undercover Brother, Let's Go to Prison and The Brothers Solomon. McBride portrayed eight different characters in the play Nagataki Sake, directed by Robert Downey, Sr.

He starred in Human Target as Winston, business partner of Christopher Chance (the protagonist). The show premiered on January 17, 2010, on FOX.

Starting in 2013, he starred on Hawaii Five-0 as Captain Lou Grover. He previously worked with co-star Scott Caan in Gone in 60 Seconds.

On May 14, 2021, CBS announced that McBride would star along with Pete Holmes and Katie Lowes in a sitcom based around the life of laid-off auto worker-turned-professional bowler Tom Smallwood. McBride plays Archie, a bowling alley owner who serves as friend and mentor to the main character played by Holmes. The multi-camera series debuted on March 31, 2022.

Filmography

Film

Television

References

External links

 
 Chi McBride at MTV.com
 

1961 births
Male actors from Chicago
African-American male actors
American male television actors
American male film actors
American male voice actors
Living people
20th-century American male actors
21st-century American male actors
20th-century African-American people
21st-century African-American people